Gavriil Apostolidis (born 12 January 1989) is a Greek football player.

External links
Profile at Sport.gr
Guardian Links
Profile at Onsports.gr

1989 births
Living people
Greek footballers
Doxa Drama F.C. players
Asteras Tripolis F.C. players
Kavala F.C. players
Association football defenders
Footballers from Kavala